Yuri (ゆり, ユリ) is a Japanese given name. Although it sounds similar, it is completely unrelated to the Slavic name Yuri.

Possible writings
Yuri can be written using different kanji characters and can mean:
由里, "reason, village"
由理, "reason, logic"
由利, "reason, profit"
由梨, "reason, pear"
祐里, "to help, village"
友里, "friend, village"
友理, "friend, logic"
有里, "exist, village"
有莉, "exist, white jasmine/pear"
百合, "lily"
The name can also be written in hiragana or katakana.

People
, Japanese voice actress
, Japanese model and actress
, Japanese singer and rapper
, Japanese long-distance runner
, Japanese opera singer
, Japanese-American activist
Yuri Komura (born 1992), Japanese ice hockey player
, Japanese actress, writer and adult video actress
Yuri Masuda (益田 祐里, Born 1977), Japanese singer, Yuri Barbarice (2021/2022), Yuri Gargarine (1979/2003)
, Japanese actress and model
 Japanese field hockey player
, Japanese model
, Japanese actress and singer
, Japanese composer and singer
, Japanese manga artist
, Japanese voice actress
, Japanese voice actress and singer
, Japanese voice actress
, Japanese businesswoman
Yuri (poet) (百合;1694 – 1764), Japanese poet and calligrapher
Yuuri (singer-songwriter)(優里 ), Japanese singer-songwriter and YouTuber

Fictional characters 

, a character in the light novel series Dirty Pair
, a character in the visual novel Doki Doki Literature Club!
, a character in the anime series Aikatsu Stars!
, a character in the video game series Art of Fighting
, a character in the manga series Wedding Peach
, a character from the anime HeartCatch Pretty Cure!
, a character in the manga series Red River
Yuri Tamura (ゆり), a character in the manga Watamote. She is the friend and love interest of the protagonist, Tomoko

Yūri

Yūri or Yuuri (ゆうり, ユウリ) is a separate unisex Japanese given name, though it may be romanized the same way.

Possible writings
悠里, "permanence, village"
裕理, "abundant, logic"
優理, "excellent, logic"
侑李, "urge to eat, plum"
勇利, "courage, profit"
The name can also be written in hiragana or katakana.

People
, Japanese singer and actor
, Japanese golfer
, Japanese footballer
, Japanese singer
, Japanese speed skater
, Japanese snowboarder
, Japanese actress

Fictional characters
, a character in the manga series Girls' Last Tour
, a character from Super Danganronpa Another 2: Moon of Hope and Sun of Despair
, a character from the video game series Fatal Frame
, a character in the manga series School-Live!
, a character in the Super Sentai season Mirai Sentai Timeranger
, a character in Fire Emblem: Three Houses
, a character in Doki Doki Literature Club
, the main character in the video game Tales of Vesperia

See also
Yuriko
Yuri (Slavic name) 
Yu-ri (Korean name)

Japanese feminine given names
Japanese unisex given names